Archips peratratus is a species of moth of the family Tortricidae. It is found in Japan.

The wingspan is 19–25 mm for males and 23–28 mm for females.

The larvae feed on Ardisia sieboldii, Camellia japonica, Clerodendrum trichotomum, Daphniphyllum teysmannii, Lithocarpus edulis, Myrsine seguinii, Rhaphiolepis umbellata and Dioscorea species.

References

Moths described in 1961
Archips
Moths of Japan